Florantyrone (INN; also known as fluorantyrone) is a drug used in the treatment of biliary dyskinesia. It is also known as a cholagogue and choleretic.

It is manufactured from fluoranthene and succinic anhydride in the presence of aluminum chloride in a nitrobenzene solution. (US PATENT 2,560,425 (1951 To Miles Lab)).

References

Laxatives